

The European Political Co-operation (EPC) was the common term for the co-ordination of foreign policy between member states of the European Communities (EC) from its inception in 1970 until the EPC was superseded by the new European Union's (EU) Common Foreign and Security Policy (CFSP) pillar upon the entry into force of the Maastricht Treaty in November 1993.

Background
In the 1950s and 1960s, the EC member states tried twice to give the internal market a foreign policy dimension but failed on both attempts. The concept of EPC had been under consideration from early 60s but due to opinion difference between General de Gaulle and his partners , its implementation had been halted. Subsequent development of both political and economic activities in countries outside Europe forced the members to review their foreign policies. This was after General de Gaulle retired from political office.

Creation
The idea of the supranational European Defence Community came about following a summit in The Hague (1969) in which the EC heads of state and government instructed their foreign ministers to "study the best way of achieving progress in the matter of political unification, within the context of enlargement." The foreign ministers subsequently drafted the Luxembourg/Davignon report (1970), which created an informal intergovernmental consultation mechanism where member states could achieve "politics of scale" (Ginsberg, 1989).

While EPC adopted the intergovernmental nature of the Fouchet Plans, it disregarded the 'French grandeur' of the Charles de Gaulle era. The involvement of the United Kingdom guaranteed its Atlanticist nature. The European Commission would furthermore be able to express its opinion if matters within its competencies were concerned. Finally, the EPC did not have the strong Paris-based Secretariat of the Fouchet proposals. The Netherlands had always been anxious about this idea, as they thought that it might turn into a competitor for the European Commission.

Changes
On 6 January, 1981, Hans Dietrich Genscher in his speech emphasized on the importance of EPC strengthening.

The EPC was amended and strengthened in the Copenhagen report (1973) and London report (1981). It was codified (formalized) with the Single European Act (1986).

The EPC turned out to be a "mixed success." During the 1970s, it was an active player in the Middle East conflict and in the creation of the Conference on Security and Co-operation in Europe, the predecessor of the Organization for Security and Co-operation in Europe. The Soviet–Afghan War (1979) and the handling of the Yugoslav Wars (1991–1995), however, showed the weakness of the EPC.

Transformation into the Common Foreign and Security Policy
The EPC was superseded by the Common Foreign and Security Policy in the Maastricht Treaty of November 1993.

See also
 History of the European Union
 European Defence Community and European Political Community (1952)
 Common Foreign and Security Policy
 Rome Declaration

Notes

References
Highly recommended reading
 Nuttall, S.J. (1992), European Political Co-operation, Oxford: Clarendon Press.
 Smith, M.E. (2004), Europe’s Foreign and Security Policy: The Institutionalization of Cooperation, Cambridge: Cambridge University Press.

Further reading
 Allen, D., Rummel, R. & Wessels, W. (1982), European Political Cooperation: Towards a Foreign Policy for Western Europe, London: Butterworth Scientific.
 Ginsberg, R.H. (1989), Foreign Policy Actions of the European Community: The Politics of Scale, Boulder: Lynne Rienner.
 Holland, M. (ed.) (1991), The Future of European Political Cooperation: Essays in Theory and Practice, Basingstoke: Macmillan.
 Pijpers, A. et al. (eds.), European Political Cooperation in the 1980s: A Common Foreign Policy for Western Europe?, Dordrecht: M. Nijhoff.
 Regelsberger, E., De Schoutheete de Tervarent, P. & Wessels, W. (eds.) (1997), Foreign Policy of the European Union: From EPC to CFSP and Beyond, London: Lynne Rienner.
 Smith, H. (2002), European Union Foreign Policy: What it is and What is Does London: Pluto Press.

1970 introductions
1993 disestablishments
Foreign relations of the European Union
Military history of the European Union